Munger division is an administrative geographical unit of Bihar state of India. Munger is the administrative headquarters of the division. The division consists of Munger district, Lakhisarai District , Jamui district, Khagaria district,  and Sheikhpura district. Earlier all these districts were part of Munger (earlier known as Monghyr) district.

See also

Divisions of Bihar
Districts of Bihar

References

 
Divisions of Bihar